Illinois Route 129 (IL 129) is a  north–south state route in northeastern Illinois. It runs from IL 113 in downtown Braidwood north to Interstate 55 (I-55).

Route description 
IL 129 begins at a four-way intersection with IL 113 in Braidwood. The highway is an undivided two-lane surface road for its entire length. It heads northeast as Washington Street, parallel to the Union Pacific Railroad tracks and IL 53. Northeast of Braidwood, IL 129 curves northward and away from IL 53. It continues north until it terminates at an interchange with I-55. Northbound traffic on IL 129 can only enter northbound I-55, and the only access to IL 129 is from northbound I-55.

History 

SBI Route 129 originally ran from Effingham to Windsor. It was replaced by Illinois Route 32 in 1937. 

In 1957, the number was reused for a former alignment of U.S. Route 66 that ran from Gardner to Wilmington, when US 66 was rerouted onto a new freeway alignment that passed to the west of Braceville and Braidwood. That new alignment eventually became I-55.

In 1995, a section of the highway south of Braidwood was closed to through traffic when a deteriorated bowstring arch bridge over a railroad line was deemed too expensive to repair.  From 1995 until 1996, the Route 129 designation was moved to the other side of the railroad tracks, where it shared alignment with Illinois Route 53.  This designation was dropped in 1996.

This temporarily leaves this interchange with only an exit from northbound I-55 to southbound IL 129, and an entrance from northbound IL 129 to northbound I-55. A new full interchange is planned here in the future.

Major intersections

See also

 List of state highways in Illinois

References

External links

129
129
Transportation in Will County, Illinois